Philip Brown (born September 11, 1991) is a Canadian World Cup alpine ski racer specializing in slalom. Born and raised in Toronto, Ontario, he represented Canada at two Winter Olympics and three World Championships. Phil turned "pro" and joined the dual format World Pro Ski Tour in 2018, winning the tour overall title in 2019.   For the 2019/20 season Phil is currently racing full time on the World Pro Ski Tour sponsored by Surefoot.

World Cup results
 Brown's best World Cup result is 21st in giant slalom at Sölden in October 2014; his best slalom result is 22nd at Wengen in January 2018.

Season standings

World Championship results

Olympic results

References

External links

 
 Phil Brown World Cup standings at the International Ski Federation
 
 
 Alpine Canada.org – national ski team – athletes – Philip Brown
 Völkl Skis – athletes – Phil Brown

1991 births
Living people
Canadian male alpine skiers
Skiers from Toronto
Alpine skiers at the 2014 Winter Olympics
Alpine skiers at the 2018 Winter Olympics
Olympic alpine skiers of Canada